David Siradze (born 21 October 1981) is a Georgian former professional footballer who played as a striker.

Club career
Siradze was born, in Tbilisi, Soviet Union.

In February 2008 he left SC Paderborn 07 and moved on loan to PFC Spartak Nalchik in March 2008. He was released by Paderborn in January 2009.

International career
Siradze was Georgia U-21 national team member. Between 2004 and 2011 he was the member of the senior national team and scored 8 goals in 28 caps. He remains one of the top scorers of Georgian national football team.

References

External links
 
 

1981 births
Living people
Footballers from Tbilisi
Association football forwards
Footballers from Georgia (country)
Expatriate footballers from Georgia (country)
Georgia (country) international footballers
SC Paderborn 07 players
FC Erzgebirge Aue players
1. FC Union Berlin players
PFC Spartak Nalchik players
2. Bundesliga players
Russian Premier League players
Moldovan Super Liga players
Expatriate footballers in Germany
Expatriate footballers in Russia